Machel Millwood (born 28 June 1979 in Trelawny Parish) is a Jamaican soccer player who most recently played for Crystal Palace Baltimore in the USSF Second Division and the Syracuse Silver Knights of the Major Indoor Soccer League. Millwood is best known for his career in the MISL, playing for championship teams with the Baltimore Blast and helping the 2013–2014 Syracuse Silver Knights make the MISL playoffs.

Career

College
Born in Jamaica, Millwood's family moved to Maryland when he was still a child. He attended Parkdale High School, and played two years of college soccer at Prince George's Community College before transferring to Towson University as a junior.  At Towson, Millwood was an All-American Honorable Mention in 2002, was named to the Colonial Athletic Association First Team All-Conference and the CAA All-Tournament Team in 2002, to the American East Conference All-League and to the All-South Atlantic Region team in 2001 and 2002.

He ranks in the top 10 in Towson soccer history in six categories, and graduated with a bachelor's degree in business and economics.

Professional
Millwood signed with the Syracuse Salty Dogs of the USL A-League in 2003, and played in 45 matches, notching 12 goals and six assists for 30 points in his two seasons in Syracuse.  In 2004, he signed a 15-day contract with the Baltimore Blast of the Major Indoor Soccer League, eventually signing a permanent contract for the 2004–2005 season, and continued to play for the Blast through the end of the 2012-13 Season, .

In the summer of 2005 Millwood spent the summer with the Atlanta Silverbacks of the USL First Division, spending the next two seasons with the Silverbacks scoring 6 goals and adding 7 assists.  On 28 May 2009, he signed for Crystal Palace Baltimore of the USL Second Division.

It was announced on 14 November 2013 that Millwood had joined the Syracuse Silver Knights, joining former teammate and now coach in Syracuse, Tommy Tanner. Millwood was named MISL player of the week for the 14th week of the MISL 2013–2014 season on Tuesday, 18 February 2014, and is considered one of the most skilled players in the MISL.

International
Millwood has seen playing time with Jamaica's U-17 National Team, but has never been called up at senior level.

Career statistics
(correct as of 29 September 2009)

External links
 Crystal Palace Baltimore bio
 Baltimore Blast bio

References

1979 births
Living people

Association football forwards
Atlanta Silverbacks players
Baltimore Blast (2001–2008 MISL) players
Baltimore Blast (2008–2014 MISL) players
Crystal Palace Baltimore players
Expatriate soccer players in the United States
Jamaican expatriate footballers
Jamaican footballers 
Jamaican emigrants to the United States
Major Indoor Soccer League (2001–2008) players
People from Riverdale Park, Maryland
People from Trelawny Parish
Soccer players from Maryland
Syracuse Salty Dogs players
Towson Tigers men's soccer players
Towson University alumni
USL First Division players
USL Second Division players
Major Indoor Soccer League (2008–2014) players
American men's futsal players
Syracuse Silver Knights players